Australian recording artist Cody Simpson has released four studio albums, nine extended plays, one mixtape, twenty one singles (including one as a featured artist), five promotional singles and seventeen music videos. Simpson released his debut extended play, 4 U, on 21 December 2010 under Atlantic Records, preceded by the lead single "iYiYi", which peaked at number 73 on the Canadian Hot 100. The album spawned a second single, "All Day", which peaked at number 79 on the Canadian Hot 100.

Simpson released the first single from the album, "On My Mind", on 23 April 2011. Shortly afterwards, he confirmed the title of his debut album to be Coast to Coast. The second single, "Not Just You" was released on 16 September 2011, "Angel" was released on 16 December 2011. In April 2012, Simpson released the mixtape Angels & Gentlemen while waiting to release his first full-studio album Paradise.

Albums

Studio albums

Compilation albums

Mixtapes

Extended plays

Singles

As lead artist

As featured artist

Promotional singles

Guest appearances

Soundtracks

Notes

References

External links
 

Discography
Discographies of Australian artists
Pop music discographies